Llanfihangel Rhos-y-Corn is a sparsely populated community of Carmarthenshire, Wales. The population of the community taken at the 2011 census was 468.

The community is bordered by the communities of: Llanybydder; Llansawel; Llanfynydd; Llanegwad; Llanllawddog; Llanfihangel-ar-Arth; and Llanllwni, all being in Carmarthenshire. It includes the village of Brechfa.

References

Communities in Carmarthenshire